Jewish commonwealth may refer to:

 a concept for the Jewish state
 Sassanid Jewish Commonwealth
 Second Jewish Commonwealth
 see Biltmore Conference, for the proposal of establishing Palestine as a Jewish Commonwealth, prior to the establishment of Israel

See also 
 American Zion Commonwealth
 Israel